Jiří Novák was the defending champion, but lost in the second round to Paradorn Srichaphan.

Fernando González won in the final 6–7(8–10), 6–3, 7–5, 6–4, against Marcos Baghdatis.

Seeds

Draw

Finals

Top half

Bottom half

External links
Draw
Qualifying draw

Singles